Scott Hargrove (born February 1, 1995) is a Canadian racing driver from Vancouver, British Columbia.

Hargrove in the winningest driver in IMSA Porsche GT3 Cup Challenge Canada history. Having competed in both Sports car racing and Open-wheel car racing, Hargrove has become one of Canada's premier racing drivers.

Motorsports career

Hargrove began karting in 2008, winning several championships in Canada and on the west coast of the United States.

In 2010, Hargrove won the Skip Barber Racing School karting shoot-out. This granted him a scholarship to compete in the championship the following year.

In 2011, Hargrove made his car racing debut in the Skip Barber Racing School summer series in 2011, finishing second in his inaugural year of car racing.

In 2012, Hargrove moved to the U.S. F2000 National Championship driving for JDC Motorsports.

In 2013, Hargrove switched teams to Cape Motorsports with Wayne Taylor Racing. Hargrove finished second in the Winterfest and then won the 2013 series championship, capturing four wins. With his championship, Hargrove won a $383,000 USD scholarship to compete in the Pro Mazda Championship in 2014 through the Road to Indy program. Hargrove was also selected to represent Canada at the 2013 Formula Ford Festival in England through the Team Canada Scholarship.

In 2014, Hargrove won the Platinum Cup Championship in the IMSA Porsche GT3 Cup Challenge Canada and finished 2nd in the Pro Mazda Championship, after a failed gearbox in the final race of the season took away his championship lead. He was invited to the Porsche Young Driver Academy for evaluation at the end of the year.

In 2015, Hargrove followed up his previous IMSA Porsche GT3 Cup Challenge Canada season with third in the championship, after missing the first two events, winning all but one of the remaining races in the championship.

In 2016, Hargrove competed in both the Indy Lights Championship and the IMSA Porsche GT3 Cup Challenge Canada. The first Indy Lights race of the year in St. Petersburg, FL, saw Hargrove finish 2nd with Team Pelfrey, who was making their debut as an Indy Lights team. At the conclusion of 2016, Hargrove was invited by Porsche to compete in their Junior Driver Shoot-out.

In 2017, was another stand-out year for Hargrove, where he dominated the IMSA Porsche GT3 Cup Challenge Canada. This time racing for Pfaff Motorsports. Hargrove would win all but two races to claim the championship.

In 2018, Hargrove moved up to the Blancpain GT World Challenge America formerly known as the Pirelli World Challenge. In his rookie season Hargrove won the Sprint GT Championship, and finished 3rd in the Sprint-X GT Championship, co-driving with Porsche factory driver Wolf Henzler.

In 2019, Hargrove became a Porsche Selected Driver and moved to the WeatherTech SportsCar Championship with Pfaff Motorsports. Hargrove had a best finish of 3rd at Petit Le Mans. Hargrove also raced in the Blancpain GT World Challenge America Championship, co-driving with Porsche factory driver Patrick Long.

Motorsports Career Results

IMSA WeatherTech SportsCar Championship

Blancpain GT World Challenge America (Formerly Pirelli World Challenge)

IMSA Porsche GT3 Cup Challenge Canada

U.S. F2000 National Championship

Pro Mazda Championship

Indy Lights

References

External links

1995 births
Living people
People from Surrey, British Columbia
Canadian racing drivers
Indy Pro 2000 Championship drivers
Indy Lights drivers
U.S. F2000 National Championship drivers
24 Hours of Daytona drivers
GT World Challenge America drivers
Team Pelfrey drivers
Wayne Taylor Racing drivers
JDC Motorsports drivers
Michelin Pilot Challenge drivers